Tommy Ryan was an Irish sportsperson.  He played hurling with his local club Boherlahan–Dualla and with the Tipperary senior inter-county team in the 1890s. He won four All-Ireland hurling senior titles with Tipperary.

References

Boherlahan-Dualla hurlers
Tipperary inter-county hurlers
All-Ireland Senior Hurling Championship winners
Year of birth missing
Year of death missing